The Freethinkers' Party or Free Opinion Party was a Greek nationalist and monarchist party founded and led by Ioannis Metaxas who was the Prime Minister and dictator of Greece from 1936 to 1941. It was formally founded in November 1922 after the adoption of the party's manifesto that was unveiled on 13 October 1922. Metaxas had the party and all other parties dissolved following the establishment of the 4th of August Regime, in which he ruled as an official independent.

The first programmatic declaration of the party was published in the daily Nea Imera on 13 October 1922.

Election results

General elections

Senate elections

References

Ioannis Metaxas
Political parties established in 1922
Monarchist parties in Greece
Defunct nationalist parties in Greece
Far-right political parties in Greece
Fascist parties
Conservative parties in Greece
Eastern Orthodox political parties
1922 establishments in Greece
1936 disestablishments in Greece
Political parties disestablished in 1936
Metaxist parties